The 1988 All-Pacific-10 Conference football team consists of American football players chosen by various organizations for All-Pacific-10 Conference teams for the 1988 college football season.

Offensive selections

Quarterbacks
Rodney Peete, USC

Running backs
Steve Broussard, Washington St.
Leroy Holt, USC
Jon Volpe, Stanford

Wide receivers
 Erik Affholter, USC
Robb Thomas, Oregon St.

Tight ends
Scott Galbraith, USC

Tackles
Frank Cornish, UCLA

Guards
Mike Utley, Washington St.
Mike Zandofsky, Washington
Joe Tofflemire, Arizona

Centers
Mark Tucker, USC

Defensive selections

Linemen
Dana Wells, Arizona
Tim Ryan, USC
Dan Owens, USC
Dennis Brown, Washington
Matt Brock, Oregon

Linebackers
Carnell Lake, UCLA
Chance Johnson, UCLA
Scott Ross, USC
Chris Singleton, Arizona
Rob Hinckley, Stanford

Defensive backs
Darryl Henley, UCLA
Chris Oldham, Oregon
Mark Carrier, USC
Cleveland Colter, USC

Special teams

Placekickers
Robbie Keen, California

Punters
Robbie Keen, California

Return specialists 
Darryl Henley, UCLA

Key

See also
1988 College Football All-America Team

References

All-Pacific-10 Conference Football Team
All-Pac-12 Conference football teams